Diploglena is a genus of African araneomorph spiders in the family Caponiidae, first described by William Frederick Purcell in 1904.

Species
 it contains six species:
Diploglena arida Haddad, 2015 – South Africa
Diploglena capensis Purcell, 1904 (type) – South Africa
Diploglena dippenaarae Haddad, 2015 – South Africa
Diploglena karooica Haddad, 2015 – Namibia, South Africa
Diploglena major Lawrence, 1928 – Namibia, Botswana, South Africa
Diploglena proxila Haddad, 2015 – South Africa

References

Araneomorphae genera
Caponiidae
Spiders of Africa
Taxa named by William Frederick Purcell